The Milan Ciga Vasojević Cup (Serbian Cyrillic: Куп Милан Цига Васојевић) is the women's national basketball cup of Serbia. It is run by the Basketball Federation of Serbia. Named in honor of Milan Ciga Vasojević, who as coach and director lead the national team of Yugoslavia during the greatest successes of women's basketball.

After the dissolution of Serbia and Montenegro in 2006, the competition was called the Serbian Cup. At the initiative of Hemofarm in 2008 the Cup bears its present name.

History

Title holders
 2006–07 Hemofarm 
 2007–08 Hemofarm (2)
 2008–09 Hemofarm (3)
 2009–10 Hemofarm (4)
 2010–11 Partizan 
 2011–12 Hemofarm (5)
 2012–13 Partizan (2)
 2013–14 Radivoj Korać
 2014–15 Vojvodina 
 2015–16 Crvena zvezda
 2016–17 Crvena zvezda (2)
 2017–18 Partizan 1953 (3)
 2018–19 Crvena zvezda (3)
 2019–20 Kraljevo
 2020–21 Art Basket
 2021–22 Crvena zvezda (4)

The finals

Performance by club
Including titles in SFR Yugoslavia, FR Yugoslavia, Serbia and Montenegro and Serbia

See also 
 First Women's Basketball League of Serbia

References

External links
 Basketball Federation of Serbia
 List of finals in period 1992-2002 at web.archive.org

 
Women's basketball competitions in Serbia
Women's basketball cup competitions in Europe